Fish Creek is a stream in Polk County, in the U.S. state of Georgia.

Fish Creek may have been named after Chief Fish of the Cherokee.

See also
List of rivers of Georgia (U.S. state)

References

Rivers of Polk County, Georgia
Rivers of Georgia (U.S. state)